Fabien Thiémé (11 July 1952 – 27 December 2019) was a French politician.

Thiémé was born in Valenciennes on 11 July 1952, to a railway worker father active in the General Confederation of Labour. Thiémé was elected to the National Assembly as a member of the French Communist Party from Nord's 21st constituency in 1988, using the slogan "the people's champion versus the champion of businesses." Jean-Louis Borloo defeated Thiémé in 1993. Thiémé served as mayor of Marly, Nord from 2008 until his death on 27 December 2019, aged 67.

References

1952 births
2019 deaths
Chevaliers of the Légion d'honneur
Mayors of places in Hauts-de-France
French Communist Party politicians
Deputies of the 9th National Assembly of the French Fifth Republic
21st-century French politicians
People from Valenciennes